Amber Mark (born December 29, 1993) is an American singer, songwriter, and producer. She released her first mini-album, 3:33am, in May 2017. Her multifaceted style implements sounds from hip hop, R&B, soul, and bossa nova. She was nominated as a featured artist for "Best Engineered Album" at the 61st Annual Grammy Awards. Her debut album, Three Dimensions Deep, was released in January 2022.

Life and career

1993–2015: Early life
Mark was born on December 29, 1993, on a farm in Summertown, Tennessee to a Jamaican father and a German mother whose name was Mia Mark, from Kaiserslautern. Amber Mark's mother was a painter and her father was a musician. She has an older half-brother and an older sister.  She and her mother lived in Miami, New York, and Munich eventually moving to a Darjeeling monastery in India so that her mother could learn Tibetan Buddhist thangka painting. After spending a few years there, they moved back to her mother's home country, in the Pankow borough of Berlin. It was Mia Mark who gave Amber her first guitar; Amber started to teach herself how to play music. Before she attended high school Amber Mark and her mother moved back to New York City, where her godparents legally adopted her so that she could go to Talent Unlimited High School in the city.  

Amber Mark and her mother later moved back to Miami where her brother lived. Mark attended Miami Beach Senior High.  She joined the high school choir and an after school rock ensemble. She said during an interview that this was when she realized that she wanted to be an artist. She moved back later to New York City where she interned at Roc Nation. Mia Mark died in 2013 at the age of 60.

2016–2020: Career beginnings
Mark released her debut single "S P A C E" to her SoundCloud in 2016. In 2017 she released her first album, "3:33am". As Mark explained, "[t]hree has been a really common number in my life. My mother was born in 1953, my brother was born in 1983 and I was born in 1993. Then my mum passed away on June 3, at 10:23pm in 2013. Since then, I'd see threes everywhere. When I was writing the EP in New York... and out of the zone, I would check the clock and I always remember it being 3:33am." The album art features a photo taken by her sister, in which Mark is wearing a watch that reads 3:33.

Each song on the record represents one of the six stages of grief. The song "Monsoon" includes samples of her mother's voice, which she explained in an interview with Sound of Boston as "a video recording of me flying back to New York for the summer while we were living in Berlin. I wanted to make a video for my godmother from my mother. Hence why I’m telling her that they don’t speak German and that she needs to speak English. When she says she loves me that is from a more recent recording she made for me while she was in hospice." Her mother, Mia, also influenced her fashion greatly and Mark elaborated on this influence in her 2017 interview with Vogue as the "3:33am" album was being released.

In 2018 she released the EP "Conexão" that included the single "Love Me Right".

2021–present: Three Dimensions Deep

Five singles from her full-length debut album, Three Dimensions Deep, were released in 2021. The entire album was released on January 28, 2022.

Discography

Studio albums

Mini-albums

Extended plays

Singles

As lead artist

As featured artist

Awards and nominations

References

External links
 Official website
 

1993 births
Living people
American women singer-songwriters
American singer-songwriters
American people of Jamaican descent
American people of German descent
21st-century American women